Brilaroxazine (developmental code names RP-5063 and RP-5000), also known as oxaripiprazole, is an investigational atypical antipsychotic which is under development by Reviva Pharmaceuticals for the treatment of schizophrenia and schizoaffective disorder. Reviva Pharmaceuticals also intends to investigate brilaroxazine for the treatment of bipolar disorder, major depressive disorder, psychosis/agitation associated with Alzheimer's disease, Parkinson's disease psychosis, attention deficit hyperactivity disorder (ADD/ADHD), and autism. As of August 2022, it is in phase III clinical trials for schizophrenia.

Pharmacology

Pharmacodynamics
Brilaroxazine is described as a so-called "dopamine-serotonin system stabilizer" due to its unique actions on the dopamine and serotonin neurotransmitter systems compared to other antipsychotics. Specifically, it acts as a partial agonist of the D2, D3, and D4 receptors and of the 5-HT1A and 5-HT2A receptors, and as an antagonist of the 5-HT6 and 5-HT7 receptors. Brilaroxazine has high affinity for the D2S, D2L, D3, D4.4, 5-HT1A, 5-HT2A, 5-HT7, and H1 receptors, and moderate affinity for the D1, D5, 5-HT3, 5-HT6 receptors, the serotonin transporter, and the α1B-adrenergic receptor. It lacks significant affinity for the 5-HT1B, 5-HT2C, α2-adrenergic, and muscarinic acetylcholine receptors, as well as for the norepinephrine and dopamine transporters.

Chemistry
Brilaroxazine is identical to aripiprazole in chemical structure except for the replacement of one of the carbon atoms in aripiprazole's quinolinone ring system with an oxygen atom, resulting instead in a benzoxazinone ring system. The drug is also closely related structurally to brexpiprazole and cariprazine.

Recent Developments
In August, 2022, Reviva Pharmaceuticals, the manufacturer of brilaroxazine, announced successful enrollment of approximately one fifth of study participants for a phase III clinical trial of the drug.  The study, which includes clinical sites in the United States, Europe and Asia, aims to assess the efficacy of this agent in the treatment of schizophrenia.  An anticipated study completion date in March 2023 is anticipated.

See also 
 List of investigational antipsychotics
 List of investigational antidepressants

References

External links 
 Product Pipeline - Reviva Pharmaceuticals
 Brilaroxazine (RP 5063) - AdisInsight

5-HT1A agonists
5-HT2A agonists
5-HT6 antagonists
5-HT7 antagonists
Atypical antipsychotics
Benzoxazines
Chloroarenes
D2-receptor agonists
Dopamine agonists
Experimental drugs
Lactams
Piperazines
Serotonin reuptake inhibitors